Yana Qaqa (Quechua yana black, qaqa rock, "black rock", also spelled Yana Khakha) is a mountain in the Bolivian Andes which reaches a height of approximately . It is located in the Potosí Department, Tomás Frías Province, Potosí Municipality, north of the city of Potosí.

References 

Mountains of Potosí Department